Lisu is a Unicode block containing characters of the Fraser alphabet, which is used to write the Lisu language. This alphabet (and by extension the block) consists of glyphs resembling capital letters in the basic Latin alphabet in their standard form and horizontally or vertically mirrored.

The addition of the block was subject to significant debate as to whether allocating a new block was necessary for the alphabet or if the turned letters not already in Unicode could instead be added to an existing block for the Latin script. However, since the Lisu letters only visually resemble their Latin counterparts and are semantically different, the former approach was ultimately taken.

This block is supported by a few fonts including Noto Sans Lisu, Lisu Unicode, DejaVu Sans, Horta, Montagel, Quivira, Segoe UI (since Windows 8), and Highway Gothic (Wide, version 2.0.3).

In Unicode 13.0, a new block was also assigned for a single supplementary Lisu character used for the Naxi language, Lisu Supplement.

History
The following Unicode-related documents record the purpose and process of defining specific characters in the Lisu block:

References 

Unicode blocks